Backbone is a 1923 American silent drama film produced by George Arliss (through his Distinctive Pictures company), released by Goldwyn Pictures and directed by Edward Sloman. Broadway actor Alfred Lunt stars in his film debut. It is not known whether the film currently survives. The film has a locale in a New England lumber camp with the exception of an episode taking place in France.

Cast
Edith Roberts - Yvonne de Mersay/Yvonne de Chausson
Alfred Lunt - John Thorne/Andre de Mersay
William B. Mack - Anthony Bracken
Frankie Evans - Doc Roper
James D. Doyle - Colonel Tip
L. Emile La Croix - Andre de Mersay
Charles Fang - The Chinaman
Marion Abbott - Mrs. Whidden
Frank Hagney - The Indian
Sam J. Ryan - Paddy
George MacQuarrie - The Constable of France
William Walcott - Count de Chausson
Jack W. Johnston - Captain of the Guards (*as J.W. Johnston)
Adolph Milar - The Mailer
Hugh Huntley - King

References

External links

allmovie/synopsis; Backbone
period lobby poster

1923 films
American silent feature films
Films directed by Edward Sloman
Goldwyn Pictures films
1923 drama films
Silent American drama films
American black-and-white films
Lost American films
1923 lost films
Lost drama films
1920s American films